Havana is a city in Mason County, Illinois, United States. The population was 2,963 at the 2020 census, down from 3,301 in 2010. It is the county seat of Mason County.

History
Havana was a major ancient American settlement two thousand years ago, when the largest verified mound of the Western Hopewell Culture was built. Local landmarks were mentioned in the journals of French explorers in the late 1600s. A religious medal dating from the early 1700s suggests that there was missionary activity in what is now Havana. When permanent English-speaking residents arrived in 1822, there was a Pottawatomie village on the site. A ferry was established to the western bank of the Illinois River to a road that followed the Spoon River. There were War of 1812 bounty lands in western Illinois. 

Abraham Lincoln was a frequent visitor to Havana between his days as a soldier in the Black Hawk Wars until at least his three-hour speech on the Rockwell Mound while he was running for the US Senate in 1858. Stephen Douglas had spoken there the day before. When he was younger, Lincoln rode a mail route from New Salem to Havana. Later, he was a local surveyor, and then an itinerant attorney. Mason County was the only place where Lincoln owned farmland. The English-speaking settlement was originally called "Ross's Ferry" and was later named after Havana, the capital of Cuba. Havana was notorious as a gambling river town, and it is reported that names such as Al Capone would hunt, fish, and gamble in the local clubs.

Geography
Havana is located in western Mason County on the Illinois River at  (40.297067, -90.060004). U.S. Route 136 passes through the city as Dearborn Street, South Promenade Street, and East Laurel Street, leading east  to San Jose and west  to Macomb. US 136 crosses the Illinois River on the Scott Wike Lucas Bridge. Illinois Routes 78 and 97 join US 136 passing through Havana and crossing the Illinois River. IL 78 leads south-southwest (downriver)  to Bath and north  to Canton, while IL 97 leads south-southeast  to Kilbourne and northwest  to Lewistown.

Demographics

As of the census of 2000, there were 3,577 people, 1,467 households, and 981 families residing in the city. The racial makeup of the city was 98.49% White, 0.14% African American, 0.14% Native American, 0.53% Asian, 0.06% from other races, and 0.64% from two or more races. Hispanic or Latino of any race were 0.59% of the population.

There were 1,467 households, out of which 28.9% had children under the age of 18 living with them, 49.8% were married couples living together, 12.5% had a female householder with no husband present, and 33.1% were non-families. 29.6% of all households were made up of individuals, and 17.2% had someone living alone who was 65 years of age or older. The average household size was 2.35 and the average family size was 2.88.

In the city, the population was spread out, with 23.7% under the age of 18, 8.3% from 18 to 24, 25.7% from 25 to 44, 20.1% from 45 to 64, and 22.3% who were 65 years of age or older. The median age was 40 years. For every 100 females, there were 87.5 males. For every 100 females age 18 and over, there were 83.7 males.

The median income for a household in the city was $30,316, and the median income for a family was $35,684. Males had a median income of $30,833 versus $21,215 for females. The per capita income for the city was $16,781. About 10.2% of families and 12.0% of the population were below the poverty line, including 18.9% of those under age 18 and 7.5% of those age 65 or over.

Notable people

 Fred Beck, MLB player for the Boston Doves, Cincinnati Reds and Philadelphia Phillies
 Roy Hamey, MLB executive (New York Yankees)
 Scott W. Lucas, U.S. senator from Illinois
 Paul Samuell, Illinois Supreme Court justice

References

External links

The Nature Conservancy's Emiquon Project - The Emiquon Project, a  wetland restoration project located across the Illinois River from Havana
Historic Water Tower
Havana City Data
Havana Attractions

Cities in Illinois
Cities in Mason County, Illinois
County seats in Illinois